Fredrik Lindahl (born 16 September 1983) is a Swedish handball player for HK Malmö and previously for the Swedish national men's handball team.

He won the Danish Championship in 2008, with FCK Håndbold. He has previously played for Redbergslids IK in the best league of his homeland.

External links

1983 births
Living people
Swedish expatriate sportspeople in Denmark
Swedish male handball players
Redbergslids IK players